Sant'Antnin Family Park (Maltese: Il-Park ta Sant Antnin) is a large park and playground complex  west of the town of Marsaskala, located on the eastern edge of the island of Malta.

The Sant' Antin Recycling plant is located adjacent to the park, causing controversy after the 2017 fire that shutdown recycling on the island for more than 3 years. The park was a landfill in the past which had been developed into what it is today using funds given to the Maltese Government by the European Union. Sant'Antnin also houses a football pitch, an outdoor gym and used to be an enclosed dog park but now it is gone.

References 

 Parks in Malta